George Stapleton (by 1519 – 1561/68) was an English politician.

He was a Member (MP) of the Parliament of England for Barnstaple in 1555.

References

1560s deaths
Members of the Parliament of England (pre-1707) for Barnstaple
English MPs 1555
Year of birth uncertain